Shaykh Mowafaq Tarīf is the qadi (spiritual leader) of the Druze in Israel.

Tarif was born in 1963 in the city of Julis. Since 1753, his family has been leading the Druze community in Mandatory Palestine and then Israel. In 1993, he inherited the position of spiritual leader upon the death of his grandfather, Sheikh Amin Tarif.

In January 2004, Tarif signed a declaration calling on non-Jews living in Israel to observe the Noahide Laws. He was joined by the mayor of Shefa-'Amr.

References

Israeli Druze religious leaders
Living people
1963 births
Ono Academic College alumni